Ian James Parsley (born 3 May 1977) is a businessman and former, part-time politician from Northern Ireland. He was the Alliance Party candidate at the 2009 European elections, and served as Deputy Mayor of North Down.

He attracted considerable criticism and caused much controversy by endorsing the Conservatives and Unionists and standing as a parliamentary candidate for North Down in the 2010 General Election, but later that same year he left the Conservative Party having completed a year-long project with the Centre for Social Justice and subsequently rejoined the Alliance Party. He is an outspoken opponent of Brexit.

Background
Although of Northern Irish heritage on his mother's side, Parsley was born in Yorkshire and educated at Merchant Taylors' School and Newcastle University, graduating in Modern Languages.

Parsley currently works in public relations, as a media commentator on languages, welfare reform and football, and is a Director of Northern Ireland Screen. He was also Chair of the European Movement in Northern Ireland.

Other activities
Parsley is a writer in and about Ulster Scots and, despite having run against her at the 2010 UK general election, he has campaigned alongside Sylvia Hermon on support for people with dementia and their carers.

Personal life
Parsley has been married to  Alliance MLA for Belfast South Paula Bradshaw since 2011. He is an avid Arsenal FC fan and a keen language hobbyist, a subject about which he often writes.

References

Further reading
 
  
 
 

1977 births
Living people
Alliance Party of Northern Ireland politicians
Alumni of Newcastle University
Conservative Party (UK) politicians
People educated at Merchant Taylors' School, Northwood
Businesspeople from Northern Ireland
Male non-fiction writers from Northern Ireland
21st-century writers from Northern Ireland